Amboseli National Park, formerly Maasai Amboseli Game Reserve, is a national park in Kajiado South Constituency in Kajiado County, Kenya. The local people are mainly Maasai, but people from other parts of the country have settled there attracted by the successful tourist-driven economy and intensive agriculture along the system of swamps that makes this low-rainfall area, average , one of the best wildlife-viewing experiences in the world with 400 species of birds including water birds like pelicans, kingfishers, crakes, hamerkop and 47 raptor species.

The park protects two of the five main swamps, and includes a dried-up Pleistocene lake and semiarid vegetation.

History

In 1883, Jeremy Thompson was the first European to penetrate the feared Maasai region known as Empusel (meaning 'salty, dusty place' in Maa). He, too, was astonished by the fantastic array of wildlife and the contrast between the arid areas of the dry lake bed and the oasis of the swamps, a contrast that persists today.

Amboseli was set aside as the Southern Reserve for the Maasai in 1906, but returned to local control as a game reserve in 1948. Gazetted a national park in 1974 to protect the core of this unique ecosystem, it was declared a UNESCO site in 1991. The park earned $3.5 m (€2.9 m) in 2005. On 29 September 2005, Kenyan President Mwai Kibaki declared that control of the park should pass from the Kenya Wildlife Service to the Olkejuado County Council and the Maasai tribe. Some observers saw this as a political favour in advance of a vote on a new Kenyan constitution; legal challenges are currently in court. The degazetting would divert park admission fees directly to the county council with shared benefits to the Maasai immediately surrounding the park.

Wildlife

The park is famous for being the best place in the world to get close to free-ranging elephants. Other attractions of the park include opportunities to meet Maasai and visit a Maasai village. The park also has views of Mount Kilimanjaro, the highest free-standing mountain in the world.

Amboseli was home to Echo, the most researched elephant in the world, and the subject of many books and documentaries, followed for almost four decades by American conservationist Dr. Cynthia Moss. Echo died in 2009 when she was about 60 years old.

The park was also a safe haven to an incredible bull elephant named Tim. This mighty leviathan quickly became one of the major attractions with his size and iconic tusks that reached the ground and was estimated to be around 50 years old at the time of his death from natural causes on 5 February 2020.

Amboseli National Park offers some of the best opportunities to see African wildlife because the vegetation is sparse due to the long, dry months. The protected area is home to African bush elephant, Cape buffalo, impala, lion, cheetah, spotted hyena, Masai giraffe, Grant's zebra, and blue wildebeest. A host of large and small birds occur too.

The park has several rules to protect the wildlife: Never leave the vehicle, except at designated spots; do not harass the animals in any way; always keep to the tracks; no off-road driving; and always give the animals the right of way. The roads in Amboseli have a loose surface of volcanic soil that is dusty in the dry season and impassable in the wet season.

Access 
A small airport is in Amboseli, the Amboseli Airport (HKAM).

See also
Amboseli Elephant Research Project
Amboseli Baboon Research Project
Kajiado County

References

External links 

 https://web.archive.org/web/20140425234012/http://amboselinationalpark.co.ke/ official website for Amboseli National Park 
 Amboseli- Africa's Elephant Park – The Official Guide
Amboseli park -Amboseli national park web portal
 Kenya Wildlife Service – Amboseli National Park

 
Great Rift Valley
Biosphere reserves of Kenya
National parks of Kenya
Kajiado County
Protected areas established in 1974
Tourist attractions in Rift Valley Province
Northern Acacia-Commiphora bushlands and thickets